Balmain Cemetery was a cemetery in Leichhardt, New South Wales, Australia (the area is very close to the present day Sydney suburb of Balmain). The Pioneers Memorial Park now stands in its place.

History
When the estate of Balmain was laid out in 1852, concerns were raised about the failure to reserve land for a cemetery and for parkland.

In August 1863, a meeting of local residents sought to establish a cemetery in Balmain. It was proposed to fund the development of the cemetery by residents subscribing £1 entitling them to one grave plot (or multiples thereof). The government would then match the funds raised by the community. The land would be apportioned into sections for different religions with some land reserved for general use. Although the majority were in favour of the idea, there was opposition to the plan, based on objections of hygiene, the poor use of land (given the expectation that the area would become densely populated), and that it might impede the development of a future highway.

Permission to enable the creation of a cemetery was passed by Parliament in 1864. The Balmain Cemetery Company (a group of five people) was established in the 1860s and purchased a block of land bounded by Derbyshire Road, Allen Street, Norton Street, and William Street (approximately 11 acres). The Balmain Cemetery Company applied for rights over the property in 1880. The cemetery opened in 1868. In 1886  the cemetery was transferred to the Leichhardt Municipal Council.
The cemetery was closed in 1912 with over ten thousand burials.

Pioneers Memorial Park

For the next two decades, a proposal to redevelop the cemetery as a public park was debated. In 1941, it was decided to replace the cemetery with parkland (called Pioneers Memorial Park). The plans were advertised and families were invited to arrange for re-interment of bodies or removal of memorials. As a consequence, the memorial to Robert Towns (the founder of Townsville, Queensland) was relocated to Castle Hill in Townsville. The memorial for Edmund Blacket and his wife Sarah were relocated to Camperdown Cemetery.

Notable people buried in Balmain Cemetery

 Edmund Blacket, architect
 William Salmon Deloitte, merchant
 Robert D. FitzGerald, botanist
 James Gorman (VC)
 Robert McIntosh Isaacs, politician
 Ninian Melville, politician
 Henry Beaufoy Merlin, photographer, illusionist, artist
 Morris Birkbeck Pell, mathematician
 Ferdinand Hamilton Reuss, architect
 Thomas Stephenson Rowntree, master mariner and shipbuilder
 Robert Towns, founder of Townsville, Queensland
 Mary Reibey, merchant, shipowner and trader 
 Charles Frederick Young, actor and comedian

References

Cemeteries in Sydney
1868 establishments in Australia
1912 disestablishments in Australia